Amphidomataceae is a family of dinoflagellates belonging to the class Dinophyceae, order unknown.

Genera:
 Amphidoma
 Azadinium

References

Dinophyceae
Dinoflagellate families